Mykola Yuriyovych Ahapov (born 13 November 1993) is a Ukrainian professional footballer who plays as a forward for Uzbekistani club Mash'al Mubarek.

Career
Born in Kharkiv, in 2006 Ahapov began his career in the local Arsenal youth sportive school with a short stint in Metalist academy. Graduated in 2010, until 2013 Ahapov played in amateur competitions after which he was picked by the First League Desna Chernihiv. Until 2017 he stayed in competitions of the First League playing for Helios and Avanhard. In 2017 Ahapov managed to sign with some clubs abroad for couple of year.

In 2019 Ahapov returned to Ukraine and in 2020 joined the newly formed Alians. In May 2021 he was recognized as a player of the month by the Ukrainian PFL.

References

External links
 
 
 

1993 births
Living people
Footballers from Kharkiv
Ukrainian footballers
FC Arsenal Kharkiv players
FC Kolos Zachepylivka players
FC Desna Chernihiv players
FC Helios Kharkiv players
FC Kramatorsk players
Surkhon Termez players
FC Alians Lypova Dolyna players
FK Mash'al Mubarek players
Association football forwards
Uzbekistan Pro League players
Ukrainian First League players
Ukrainian expatriate footballers
Expatriate footballers in Turkey
Expatriate footballers in Uzbekistan
Ukrainian expatriate sportspeople in Turkey
Ukrainian expatriate sportspeople in Uzbekistan